Italia Marianna Vitaliani (20 August 1866 – 6 December 1938) was an Italian stage and silent film actress.

Life and career 
The daughter of theatrical actors Vitaliano and Elisa Duse and a nephew of famous actress Eleonora Duse, Vitaliani made her stage debut as a child actress in her father's company. After becoming first actress in the company directed by Giambattista Marini, in 1892 she formed her own company, with whom she toured for long periods abroad, including in Russia and in South America.
 
Starting from 1919 she mainly devoted herself to teaching, first at a Florence drama school and later at the Accademia Nazionale di Santa Cecilia. Her late years were difficult, with Vitaliani suffering from depression, as well as from physical and financial problems. In 1931 she founded her own drama school in Milan, where she died a few years later.

References

External links 
 
 

1866 births
1938 deaths
Actors from Turin
Italian silent film actresses
Italian stage actresses
Film people from Turin